Heinz Rudolf Erich Arthur Kunze (born 30 November 1956, in Espelkamp-Mittwald, North Rhine-Westphalia) is a German writer and rock singer. His greatest hit was Dein ist mein ganzes Herz (not to be confused with the homonymous song from the operetta Das Land des Lächelns) in 1985.

Life and career 
Kunze was born in the refugee camp Espelkamp near Minden. His family had been expelled from Guben (Niederlausitz, now partially Poland). His father, an officer for the Waffen-SS and long-time prisoner of war, had returned only in the same year. In the 1980s, he rose to prominence as a singer. HRK, as he is often called, has also written books, and has translated musicals into German. In 2002, Kunze narrated Piktors Verwandlungen, a 40-minute piece of the German band Anyone's Daughter after a fairy tale by German author Hermann Hesse, during a festival in honoring the late Nobel laureate in his home town Calw. In the national selection for Germany in the Eurovision Song Contest 2007, the singer/songwriter entered with "Die Welt ist Pop" (The World Is Pop), finishing 3rd.

Work

Albums and CDs (selected) 
"D" refers to highest German chart rank
 1981 – Reine Nervensache
 1985 – Dein ist mein ganzes Herz (D 8)
 1986 – Wunderkinder (D 18)
 1991 – Brille (D 4)
 1994 – Kunze: Macht Musik (D 10)
 1999 – Korrekt (D 12)
 2001 – Halt (D 10)
 2005 – Das Original (D 28)
 2007 – Klare Verhältnisse (D 21)
 2013 – Stein vom Herzen (D 18)
 2016 – Deutschland (D 8)
 2016 – Meisterwerke:Verbeugungen (D 37)
 2018 – Schöne Grüße vom Schicksal (D 16)
 2020 – Der Wahrheit die Ehre

Literature 
 1991 – Sternzeichen Sündenbock
 1994 – Der Golem aus Lemgo
 2002 – Wasser bis zum Hals steht mir
 2006 – Kommando Zuversicht

Singles (selected) 
 1985 – "Dein ist mein ganzes Herz" (D 8)
 1989 – "Alles was sie will" (D 51)
 1991 – "Alles gelogen" (D 78)
 1992 – "Finderlohn" (D 55)
 1994 – "Leg nicht auf" (D 56)
 1999 – "Aller Herren Länder" (D 75)
 2008 – "Langere Tage" (D 93)

Musicals 
 1987 – Les Misérables (translation into German)
 1994 – Miss Saigon (deutsche Version: Übersetzung HRK)
 1996 – Joseph and the Amazing Technicolor Dreamcoat (deutsche Version: Übersetzung HRK)
 1999 – RENT (deutsche Version: Übersetzung HRK)
 2003 – Ein Sommernachtstraum (nach Shakespeare, HRK gemeinsam mit Heiner Lürig)
 2004 – POE — Pech und Schwefel (HRK gemeinsam mit Frank Nimsgern)
 2007 – Kleider machen Liebe – oder: Was ihr wollt (nach Shakespeare, HRK gem. mit Heiner Lürig)

Books (selected) 
 1984 – Deutsche Wertarbeit — Lieder und Texte 1980–1982
 1986 – Papierkrieg — Lieder und Texte 1983–1985
 1992 – Mucken und Elefanten — Lieder und Texte 1986–1991
 1997 – Heimatfront — Lieder und Texte 1995–1997
 1999 – heinz rudolf kunze: agent provocateur
 2005 – Artgerechte Haltung — Lieder und Texte 2003–2005

by others
 2005 – Silbermond samt Stirnenfuß — HRK Texte und Musik von 1980 bis 2005 von Holger Zürch
 2007 – Heinz Rudolf Kunze — Meine eigenen Wege. Die Biographie von Karl-Heinz Barthelmes

External links 
 
 
 Stirnenfuss — Die Heinz Rudolf Kunze Community im Internet
 Biographie bei Laut.de
 Die Hamburger Morgenpost zu Kunzes Tour 2007
 Wunderkinder.de — Der Heinz Rudolf Kunze Fanclub im Internet
 Große Akkorde und Tabulatur — Sammlung
 ZDF-Meldung: HRK als Dozent der Fachhochschule Osnabrück

1956 births
Living people
People from Minden-Lübbecke
German male singers
German rock singers
German male musicians
Studienstiftung alumni